August Guenther Felix (May 24, 1895 – May 12, 1960) was an American former professional baseball outfielder. He played in Major League Baseball (MLB) for the Boston Braves and Brooklyn Robins between 1923 and 1927.

References

External links

1895 births
1960 deaths
Major League Baseball outfielders
Brooklyn Robins players
Boston Braves players
Baseball players from Ohio
Minor league baseball managers
Tampa Smokers players
Charleston Pals players
Kansas City Blues (baseball) players
Shreveport Gassers players
Buffalo Bisons (minor league) players
Rochester Red Wings players
Birmingham Barons players
Houston Buffaloes players
Memphis Chickasaws players